The Caribbean Development Bank (CDB) is a development bank that helps Caribbean nations finance social and economic programs in its member countries. CDB was established by an Agreement signed on October 18, 1969, in Kingston, Jamaica, and entered into force on January 26, 1970. The permanent headquarters of the bank is located at Wildey, St. Michael, Barbados; adjacent to the campus of the Samuel Jackman Prescod Polytechnic. On September 21, 2018, the Bank officially opened its Country Office in Haiti, the first outside its Headquarters in Barbados. The Barbados headquarters serves all of the regional borrowing member countries with staff recruited from its member countries.

CDB's membership of 28 countries consists of 19 regional borrowing members, four regional, non-borrowing members (Brazil, Colombia, Mexico and Venezuela) and five non-regional, non-borrowing members (Canada, China, Germany, Italy, and the United Kingdom). 

CDB’s total assets as at December 31, 2021 stood at US$3.71 billion (bn). These include US$2.21 bn of Ordinary Capital Resources and US$1.50 bn of Special Funds Resources. The Bank is rated Aa1 Stable by Moody’s, AA+ Stable by Standard & Poor’s and AA+ Stable by Fitch Ratings.  In 2021, the Bank approved loans and grants of US$269.5 million.

At the end of 2020, the total value of projects approved by the bank was US$122.6 million. This includes US$71.2 million in loans and US$51.4 million in grants.

History
Caribbean Development Bank was established by an Agreement between sixteen Commonwealth of Nations members from Caribbean region and Canada and United Kingdom signed on October 18, 1969, in Kingston, Jamaica. Agreement entered into force on January 26, 1970 until when 15 out of 18 signing states ratified it. Bank's initial capital was 50 million US dollars corresponding to the value of 100 million Eastern Caribbean dollar with three main contributors being Jamaica with 11,200,000 US dollars and 19.52% of votes, and United Kingdom and Canada both with 10,000,000 US dollars and each with 17.55% of votes in bank. Arthur Lewis was chosen as the first bank's president on the meeting of banks governors in Nassau.

List of presidents 
The Bank has had six presidents since its inception.

Organisation

Board of Governors 
The Board of Governors is the apex governing body of the CDB.  This Board meets once a year.  They hold the power to admit new members, amend the charter, elect the Board of Directors and the president, change the bank's outstanding capital, and dissolve the bank.  Each country is represented by one governor and one alternate, with the British Overseas Territory members counted as one country.

Board of Directors 
The Board of Directors is responsible for determining the bank's programmes and annual budget.  As with the Board of Governors, each country is represented by one director and one alternate.  Directors serve renewable two-year terms.  The Board is also responsible for appointing an Oversight and Assurance Committee.

President 
The President is the chief executive officer of the CDB, and also serves as the Chairman of the Board of Directors.  Different offices for communication, risk management, and compliance are part of the Office of the President.

Presidential candidates are nominated by individual country members.  A candidate must receive votes from two-thirds of the Board of Governors (representing 75% of the member countries) in order to be selected.  The President serves for a five-year term, and can be reelected.

Corporate leadership 
The two corporate leaders that report to the boards are the Vice-President (Corporate Services) and Bank Secretary, and the Vice-President (Operations).

Members 
As of 2021, there are nineteen borrowing members and nine non-borrowing members.

Regional

Other regional

Non-regional

United Nations Development Business
The United Nations launched Development Business in 1978 with the support of the Caribbean Development Bank, the World Bank, and many other major development banks from around the world. Today, Development Business is the primary publication for all major multilateral development banks, United Nations agencies, and several national governments, many of whom have made the publication of their tenders and contracts in Development Business a mandatory requirement.

See also 

 African Development Bank
 African, Caribbean and Pacific Group of States
 Asian Development Bank
 Asian Infrastructure Investment Bank
 New Development Bank (BRICS)/NDB BRICS
 Association of Caribbean States
 CAF – Development Bank of Latin America
 Central banks and currencies of the Caribbean
 European Investment Bank
 Islamic Development Bank

References

External links
 Official Caribbean Development Bank website

Banks of the Caribbean
International banking institutions
International organizations based in the Caribbean
Multilateral development banks
Supranational banks
Intergovernmental organizations established by treaty
Financial services companies of Barbados
Organizations established in 1969
1960s establishments in the Caribbean
1969 establishments in North America